John McNiven may refer to:
 John McNiven (weightlifter), Scottish weightlifter
 John McNiven (rower), Canadian rower
 John McNiven (footballer), Scottish football midfielder
 Jock McNiven, mine engineer, mine operator and politician from the Northwest Territories, Canada